The 2020 Belgian Road Cycling Cup (known as the Bingoal Cycling Cup for sponsorship reasons) was the fifth edition of the Belgian Road Cycling Cup. Baptiste Planckaert was the defending champion. He was not succeeded as the organisers decided not to keep the overall standings due to the large number of cancelled races as a result of the COVID-19 pandemic.

Events
With respect to the previous season the event in Halle–Ingooigem was dropped due to the organisers of this race focusing on the organisation of the 2020 Belgian National Road race championships. As a result the number of events dropped from eight to seven, although the late cancellation of the Grote Prijs Jean-Pierre Monseré due to storms in 2019 resulted in just seven races to be held that year as well. Eventually only two races were held as only the Grote Prijs Jean-Pierre Monseré was completed before the COVID-19 pandemic in Belgium, thereafter all other races got cancelled with the exception of Dwars door het Hageland which was rescheduled from 17 June 2020 to 15 August 2020.

Race results

Grote Prijs Jean-Pierre Monseré

Dwars door het Hageland

Notes

References

External links
  Official website

Belgian Road Cycling Cup
Belgian Road Cycling Cup
Road Cycling Cup
Belgian Road Cycling Cup, 2020